Qahhor Mahkamov (alternative spelling Kahar Mahkamov; 16 April 1932 – 8 June 2016) was a Tajik politician who served as First Secretary of the Communist Party of Tajikistan from 1985 to 1991 and was the first President of Tajikistan from November 1990 until his fall in the August 1991 coup.

Early life and career
Mahkamov was born into a working-class family in the northern city of Khujand on 16 April 1932. He graduated from Dushanbe Industrial Technicom in 1949 and from the Leningrad Mining Institute in 1952 with a degree in engineering. He worked as a professor, head engineer, and director of a mine in Isfara. In 1957 he became a member of the Communist Party of the Soviet Union and quickly worked his way into the high ranks of the Communist Party of Tajikistan, becoming head of the prestigious Committee of the Representatives of the Workers of Leninabad. In 1963 Mahkamov was appointed to the  Central Committee of the Communist Party of Tajikistan and from 1963 until 1982 he was Head of the Central Planning and the Vice-Director of the Cabinet of the Ministers of Tajikistan, one of the most powerful  positions in the republic.

Leader of Tajikistan
In 1985, Rahmon Nabiyev was ousted in a corruption scandal as First Secretary of the Communist Party of Tajikistan and Mahkamov was chosen to succeed him. Mahkamov's tenure was one of the most turbulent in the republic's history. His accession to power coincided with that of Mikhail Gorbachev and the advent of Perestroika and Glasnost. During Mahkamov's reign in power Tajikistan saw a surge in nationalism, which culminated in the passage of the 1989 ‘’Language Law’’ that designated Tajik the state language of the republic. This law elicited a great deal of fear among the population and an exodus of the non-Central Asian population began, especially amongst ethnic Russians, Jews and Germans.

The greatest threat to Mahkamov's power came during the February 1990 Dushanbe riots that rocked the capital. Tajik youths clashed with non-Tajiks and battles were fought in the streets of Dushanbe between rioters and police and soldiers, resulting in dozens of deaths. Mahkamov oversaw a crackdown on Islamic fundamentalists and a lengthy curfew was put in place. He served as Chairman of the Presidium of the Supreme Soviet (head of state) from 12 April to 30 November 1990. As part of the political reforms that Gorbachev was instituting the Supreme Soviet of Tajikistan appointed Mahkamov the first President of Tajikistan on 30 November 1990. Mahkamov's fall from power came in August 1991 when he supported the failed August Coup by hardliners in Moscow. Protestors took to the streets and demanded Mahkamov's ouster from power and on August 31, 1991 he resigned his positions as President and First Secretary. Mahkamov then retired from politics and sat on the sidelines during the ensuing political instability and Civil War in Tajikistan.

In 2000 Mahkamov was appointed a member of the National Assembly of Tajikistan by the order of the President Emomali Rahmonov. He died on 8 June 2016 at the age of 84, after suffering a long illness.

References

 Obituary

1931 births
2016 deaths
20th-century engineers
Heads of government of the Tajik Soviet Socialist Republic
Tenth convocation members of the Soviet of the Union
Eleventh convocation members of the Soviet of the Union
Heads of state of Tajikistan
Members of the National Assembly of Tajikistan
People from Khujand
Politburo of the Central Committee of the Communist Party of the Soviet Union members
Presidents of Tajikistan
Prime Ministers of Tajikistan
Saint Petersburg Mining University alumni
Soviet engineers
Tajikistani engineers
First Secretaries of the Communist Party of Tajikistan